The following is a list of characters that first appeared in the ITV soap opera Coronation Street in 1999, by order of first appearance.

Ian Bentley
Ian Bentley, played by Jonathan Guy Lewis, first appeared on 29 January 1999. He is introduced as the fiancé of Sharon Gaskell (Tracie Bennett). Ian begins an affair with the recently widowed Natalie Barnes (Denise Welch). Sharon discovers the affair, but intends to marry Ian regardless, dismissing the affair as one last fling. However, during the service, Sharon calls Ian a liar and jilts him. Months later, after Sharon attempts suicide, she calls Ian and the pair decide to reconcile their relationship. When Sharon returns in 2021, she reveals to Rita Tanner (Barbara Knox) that she and Ian have since parted ways due to Ian's infidelity.

Jessica Lundy

Reverend Jessica Lundy, portrayed by Olwen May, was a pastor who was best known for wedding Hayley Patterson (Julie Hesmondhalgh) and Roy Cropper (David Neilson), despite it being illegal due to Hayley being transsexual. Even Les Battersby (Bruce Jones) almost made the wedding a failure as he ran into the church and protested.

Jessica next appeared as the pastor to christen baby Bethany Platt (Amy and Emily Walton); Hayley and Bethany's teenage mother Sarah-Louise's (Tina O'Brien) best mate Candice Stowe (Nikki Sanderson) were godmothers and Roy was godfather. Bethany's uncle David (Jack P. Shepherd) was intending to be godfather, but he jealously did a runner from the church. The christening party was also ruined when Candice's mother Marion (Paula Simms) turned up and angrily dragged her daughter away, and David turned up in a police car as he was caught shoplifting.

Jessica's surname was credited in her first two appearances, but on her last appearance, her first name was revealed.

Nita Desai

Nita Desai, played by Rebecca Sarker, arrives in January as a new assistant at the Corner Shop, which her family later take over.

Nita managed the shop for Ravi when he bought it from Fred Elliott, living in the flat above. After just four months, Nita, craving independence, left the family business to climb the managerial ladder at Freshco supermarket. She spent a year as assistant manager at the Weatherfield branch before, in 2000, leaving the street for Inverness to run her own store.

Ravi Desai

Ravi Desai took over the management of the Corner Shop on Coronation Street in January 1999. Played by actor Saeed Jaffrey, Ravi left Weatherfield due to family issues later in the year, and sold his empire of corner shops in the area to his nephew, Dev Alahan (Jimmi Harkishin). In June 2019 Dev receives a phone call and learns that Ravi is dying and he takes his children Aadi and Asha to see him in India. However, when Dev returns in August, he reveals Ravi is still alive and well.

Darren Dobbs

Darren Dobbs is the father of Tyrone Dobbs (Alan Halsall) who appears in March 1999 to take his wife Jackie (Margi Clarke) home to Liverpool. Darren made a return in September 2018 to tie in with ex-wife Jackie's death among Darren's return he had revealed to Tyrone that he and Jackie weren't actually Tyrone's real parents.

Vikram Desai

Vikram Desai was played by Chris Bisson. Vikram is Dev Alahan's (Jimmi Harkishin) cousin and he used to own the shop with Dev and worked with Sunita (Shobna Gulati). During his time in Coronation Street he dated Leanne Battersby (Jane Danson) and Maria Sutherland (Samia Ghadie). In 2000 he briefly dated Candice Stowe (Nikki Sanderson) but he later learns that she is under the age of consent. In 2002 he was forced to smuggle drugs in from abroad then again, but this time he asked Steve (Simon Gregson) and Karen McDonald (Suranne Jones) if they wanted a free holiday and they accepted. When they came back Steve discovered powder at the bottom of his suitcase and inside was drugs, and found out that Vikram had done it. Karen was horrified as well as Steve and he dumped the drugs in the canal and told Vikram to leave Weatherfield for good, and if he comes back Steve said he will kill him. He now lives in India.

Vikram was mentioned when Sunita's aunts came to stay in 2010, after Dev said that they were even worse than him. In 2021, Vikram's name was seen among Aadi Alahan's (Adam Hussain) Xbox Live contacts.

Tom Ferguson

Tom Ferguson, played by actor Tom Wisdom, is the son of Duggie Ferguson (John Bowe), who arrives later in the year. Tom is a hairdresser, and worked at Audrey Roberts' (Sue Nicholls) salon until he quit in January 2000 and left Weatherfield to get away from his father.

Boris Weaver

Boris Weaver was a butcher who worked for Ashley Peacock (Steven Arnold) at Elliott and Sons butchers. Boris appeared for the first time in 1999 and appeared recurrently and made his last appearance at Christmas 2004, at Ashley's wedding to Claire Casey (Julia Haworth). From then on, Boris was still referred to and looked after the shop when Ashley was away. In later years both Kirk Sutherland (Andrew Whyment) and Graeme Proctor (Craig Gazey) successively worked for Ashley at the shop, it is assumed that Boris was no longer an employee there.

Danny Hargreaves

Danny Hargreaves is played by Richard Standing between 1999 and 2001. A market trader, Danny meets Sally Webster (Sally Dynevor) at work and begins a relationship with her. Danny and Sally fell in love and got engaged, but he jilted her on their wedding day after discovering that Sally had a one-night stand with ex-husband Kevin (Michael Le Vell).

Beryl Peacock

Beryl Hayden Peacock (also Elliott) is the sister of Fred Elliott (John Savident). Beryl and her husband Sam had raised Fred's son, Ashley Peacock (Steven Arnold), as their own. Beryl first appeared when Ashley asked her for the truth about his parentage and she was forced to tell Ashley that she was actually his aunt, not his mother. Beryl made her most recent appearance at Fred's funeral in October 2006.

Beryl did not attend Ashley's funeral when he died in a tram crash in December 2010.

Belinda Peach
Belinda Peach appears briefly at the Freshco's Summer Ball where she tries to woo Ashley Peacock (Steven Arnold). Ashley is amused by Fred Elliott's (John Savident) attempts to pair him with Belinda, despite him attending with Maxine Heavey (Tracy Shaw). Maxine gets annoyed by Belinda's overly friendly manner and pushes her in the direction of Curly Watts (Kevin Kennedy). Played by Maxine Peake.

Doreen Heavey

Doreen Heavey (also Outhwaite) is the mother of Maxine Peacock (Tracy Shaw), played by actress Prunella Gee, who had three spells on the Street between 1999 and 2004; the third of these covering the period of her daughter's death at the hands of Richard Hillman (Brian Capron) in early 2003, after which she moved back in with her ex-husband Derek, Maxine's father, in order to give their relationship another go. Doreen was last seen in November 2004 when she, Ashley Peacock (Steven Arnold) and her grandson Joshua (Benjamin Beresford) went to lay flowers on Maxine's grave on what would have been her 29th birthday. She told Ashley that she liked his new fiancée Claire Casey (Julia Haworth) and gave him her blessing to marry Claire.

Vinny Sorrell

Vinny Sorrell, played by James Gaddas appeared for a period of 15 months between 1999 and 2000. He has an on/off relationship with Natalie Barnes (Denise Welch) throughout, and works alongside her at The Rovers Return Inn as a barman and cellarman. Vinny departs Weatherfield in November 2000 after his affair with Natalie's sister Debs Brownlow (Gabrielle Glaister) is revealed. Vinny moves to Southampton with Debs where she gets a new job. Unbeknownst to Vinny, Natalie is pregnant with his child and she gives birth to their daughter, Laura, off-screen in 2001.

Kathleen Gutteridge

Kathleen Gutteridge is the biological mother of Ashley Peacock (Steven Arnold). She is first mentioned when Fred Elliott (John Savident) reveals that he is Ashley's father. Fred tries to talk him out of finding her as it would hurt Ashley's adoptive mother, in reality his aunt, Beryl Peacock (Anny Tobin). Kathleen had abandoned Ashley when he was born and Fred gave him to his sister, Beryl and her husband Sam.

When Kathleen and Ashley eventually meet, Ashley is very bitter towards her. However, they are able to eventually reconcile and Kathleen attends Ashley's wedding to Maxine Heavey (Tracy Shaw). Fred tries to woo Kathleen again, but she turns him down.

Gwen Davies

Gwen Loveday  (also Davies) is a machinist at Underworld, played by Annie Hulley for a period of eight months from 1999 to 2000.

Duggie Ferguson

Douglas William "Duggie" Ferguson was played by John Bowe. An ex-rugby league player who went into the printing business, Duggie Ferguson first came to Coronation Street after tracking down his son Tom – who worked as a hairdresser for Audrey Roberts (Sue Nicholls). Tom blamed his father for his mother's death and did not want him around. Duggie was hurt by this and bought into a local development on Victoria Street to be close to Tom but there was no reconciliation and Tom left Weatherfield and moved to Leeds.

In late 1999 to early 2000, Duggie turned property developer and employed Steve McDonald (Simon Gregson) as foreman for the building of his Victoria Street complex – those who rented the commercial units included Sally Webster (Sally Dynevor) and Danny Hargreaves (Richard Standing), butcher Fred Elliott (John Savident), and Vikram Desai (Chris Bisson) and Steve, who started up their own mini-cab firm.

Early in 2000 Duggie started a relationship with Debs Brownlow (Gabrielle Glaister), sister of The Rovers landlady Natalie Barnes (Denise Welch). Debs came to Weatherfield to be near her sister after many years working on a cruise ship as a hairdresser. Debs helped Duggie overcome his emotional block concerning women and the couple were happy until Duggie started to develop another property and tried to forcibly evict tenants including Toyah Battersby (Georgia Taylor) and Phil Simmonds (Jack Deam). Both felt that they had been treated badly, especially when Duggie employed Vinny Sorrell (James Gaddas) to evict Phil from his home. Phil went to the press and the adverse report caused Duggie's financial downfall, forcing him to sell the home that he had shared with wife Laura. Dev Alahan (Jimmi Harkishin) bought Duggie's home for a quick sale before putting it back on the market and making a tidy profit. Duggie was forced to move in with Debs, hoping to use it as an office for his business contacts but Debs had a fling with Vinny – Natalie's lover and Duggie's employee. Duggie was furious when Vinny and Debs left town with £400 of rent money.

In December 2000, Natalie decided to sell and The Rovers came under threat by a chain who planned to turn it into a "fun pub" named the Boozy Newt. Duggie stepped in to help the Rovers avoid this but could not buy the place alone so Fred and Mike Baldwin (Johnny Briggs) invested in The Rovers with Duggie. Neither of the trio wanted to run the place so they employed Liz McDonald (Beverley Callard) to run it. Liz moved into The Rovers with resident barmaid Toyah but her reign as manager was short as, after numerous disagreements with the trio, and husband Jim being transferred to a prison in Leicester, she quit and left Weatherfield. Mike's new wife, Linda (Jacqueline Pirie), took the helm of The Rovers, but her heart was not in it and Duggie persuaded his partners to sell their shares to a 'mysterious owner' – Duggie snapped up their shares and became sole owner of the Rovers.

At the end of 2001, the social club at Duggie's beloved Weatherfield Rugby League club came up for sale. Looking to raise money quickly, Duggie auctioned The Rovers – to Fred Elliott – for £76,000, only to find he had been gazumped for the Rugby Club by fellow ex-professional Marty Flynn. With time and money on his hands, he formed a business partnership with local financial advisor Richard Hillman (Brian Capron). Together, the pair worked in converting an old house – "Oakhill" into luxury flats. Things quickly went sour, however, as Richard realised that Duggie and his men were ripping him off: cutting corners on the construction work and stealing valuable fixtures and fittings from the property. One night, Richard confronted him in the building and angrily declared that their deal was off. As Richard walked away, Duggie leaned over a bannister, which gave way under him and he plummeted two floors down. Duggie was critically injured and unconscious from the fall. Richard started to phone an ambulance, but then stopped upon dialing "99" on his phone. Reflecting on Duggie's dodgy intentions and the fact that he had taken him for a fool, Richard saw an opportunity to be rid of his unwanted business partner and decided to leave him to die. Richard rifled through Duggie's pockets, and took his keys to infiltrate his house – where he managed to decode his safe and steal his cash from the sale of The Rovers. Richard then left the house discreetly, and returned to the house to put the keys back in Duggie's pocket. Richard got a shock when Duggie was gone, but realised he had only crawled to another room and died of his injuries. After leaving his body at the house for the night, Richard returned the following morning with his fiancé Gail Platt (Helen Worth) – who wanted to see the development. There, they discovered Duggie's body. Duggie's death soon became public knowledge around Weatherfield, and they arranged for his funeral a couple of weeks later; however, his son Tom never attended – as he was ostensibly too busy cutting hair on a cruise ship to attend his father's funeral.

Following the events of Duggie's death and funeral, Richard managed to cover-up his involvement in the incident for over a year. During that time, he sought to correct Duggie's mistakes on his development and went as far as to solely incriminate the deceased publican as being responsible for the situation he was in. Richard also discovered that Duggie was aware of plans to build a bail hostel near the flats, severely decreasing their potential value, but had not informed him. Richard's increasing financial woes as a result of the money he had ploughed into the development led to him killing his ex-wife Patricia (Annabelle Apsion) in May 2002 and Duggie's barmaid Maxine Peacock (Tracy Shaw) in January 2003. On 24 February 2003, over a year after Richard left Duggie for dead, his fiancé-turned-wife Gail would ultimately discover the truth behind her husband's homicidal nature. When Richard admits to killing Patricia and Maxine that night, Gail questioned his previous claims about Duggie's fate. In response, Richard confesses to leaving Duggie for dead and robbing all the money from his safe in order to put his business development forward – though he also states that Duggie is to blame for the predicament he was in, and that he deserved his fate. After Gail declared their marriage to be over, Richard left the house and became the most wanted man in the UK – once the truth about his crimes, including Duggie's demise, were exposed. Eventually in March 2003, Richard got his comeuppance when he planned to kill Gail and her children – abducting them and then driving them into the canal, only for his stepfamily to escape to safety whilst he himself drowned.

Candice Stowe

Candice Marie Islandos (also Stowe) was played by Nikki Sanderson. Candice first appeared in 1999 as Sarah-Louise Platt's (Tina O'Brien) best friend from school. She attempted to get Sarah to smoke. She and Sarah were both thirteen at the time. Candice was one of the first people Sarah told of her pregnancy. While many of Sarah's friends turned against Sarah, Candice stuck by her throughout the pregnancy and birth of her daughter Bethany Platt in 2000. Candice proved to be a good friend in times of crisis during Sarah's life, for example she and Todd Grimshaw (Bruno Langley) were instrumental in Sarah being able to evade the clutches of her paedophile kidnapper Gary in July 2001. As they grew up Candice, Sarah and their friend Maria Sutherland (Samia Ghadie) began to turn the heads of the street's men and became increasingly popular with male viewers of the show.

Dev Alahan

Devendra "Dev" Alahan, played by Jimmi Harkishin, made his first appearance on 10 November 1999. He is the ex-husband of Sunita Alahan (Shobna Gulati), and father to Amber Kalirai (Nikki Patel), Aadi Alahan (Zennon Ditchett) and Asha Alahan (Tanisha Gorey), although Amber is not Sunita's daughter. Dev has had many affairs, including ones with Deirdre (Anne Kirkbride) and Tracy Barlow (Kate Ford), and a friendship with Stella Price (Michelle Collins), whom Dev later develops feelings for. In 2012, Dev discovered that Sunita had been having an affair with Karl Munro (John Michie), and attacked him, though Karl's partner Stella slapped Sunita. In March 2013, Sunita was trapped in a fire at The Rovers Return Inn, which was started by Karl. Sunita would've made it, but Karl pulled out her oxygen tube and she suffered a cardiac arrest and died.

Rebecca Hopkins

Rebecca Hopkins was a nurse, played by actress Jill Halfpenny, who had an affair with Martin Platt (Sean Wilson). Rebecca's husband Jerry Hopkins (Ken Christiansen) was violent and after Martin helped Rebecca leave him, the pair fell in love and Martin was prepared to leave his wife Gail (Helen Worth) for Rebecca. However, when Gail's daughter Sarah-Louise (Tina O'Brien) fell pregnant aged just thirteen, Martin felt compelled to stay with his family and ended the affair. Rebecca left Weatherfield a few months later and moved to Dubai where she had been offered a new job, but the damage to the Platt's marriage was already done and Gail and Martin separated later that year. In December 2000, Martin spotted Rebecca whilst out Christmas shopping. He tracked her down to a friend's house where she was staying. They bade each other farewell tearfully but gave into their feelings for each other and ended up sleeping together again. Rebecca explained to Martin that she planned to move to Dubai permanently and offered him the chance to go with her for a fresh start but Martin refused, not wanting to abandon his children and Rebecca left for Dubai alone.

Jerry Hopkins

Jerry Hopkins, portrayed by Ken Christiansen, was the abusive ex-husband of Rebecca Hopkins (Jill Halfpenny).

In December 1999, Martin Platt (Sean Wilson) befriended Rebecca when Jerry started domestically abusing her and refused to have children. Martin and his then wife Gail (Helen Worth) met Jerry at a Christmas party, and were appalled at how he treated her. Jerry's behaviour resulted in Martin and Rebecca sleeping together and, to save his marriage, Martin ignored Rebecca. Rebecca then came into work with a black eye, making Martin feel guilty. On New Year's Eve, Jerry found Martin and Rebecca talking to each other and accused them of having an affair, but Martin sent him away with a flea in his ear.

In January 2000, Jerry discovered that Martin and Rebecca were indeed having an affair and informed Gail of this but she didn't believe him. In April, Rebecca served Jerry with divorce papers, causing Jerry to visit her flat and blame Martin for his divorce. Martin, however, put Jerry in his place, and Jerry vowed revenge, but nothing ever happened.

References

1999
, Coronation Street
Coronation Street